The San Bernardino Santa Fe Depot  (Metrolink designation San Bernardino–Depot)  is a Mission Revival Style passenger rail terminal in San Bernardino, California, United States.  It has been the primary station for the city, serving Amtrak today, and the Santa Fe and Union Pacific Railroads in the past. Until the mid-20th century, the Southern Pacific Railroad had a station 3/4 of a mile away.  It currently serves one Amtrak (Southwest Chief) and two Metrolink lines (Inland Empire–Orange County Line and San Bernardino Line).  The depot is a historical landmark listed on the National Register of Historic Places as Atchison, Topeka and Santa Fe Railway Passenger and Freight Depot.

Early history
Through its subsidiary California Southern Railroad, the Atchison, Topeka and Santa Fe Railway (ATSF) first built a two-and-a-half-story wooden structure on the site in 1886 to replace a converted boxcar that had been used as a temporary station.  The 1886 building was mostly destroyed in a fire just after midnight 17 November 1916.

In the pre-Amtrak era the station not only had Santa Fe Railway trains, it also had Union Pacific Railroad trains. The trains of both railroads served disparate destinations in the west and in central United States. Local streetcar service was provided by the Pacific Electric on their Colton Line until 1942.

Named trains in 1960 included:
Santa Fe:
Chief (Los Angeles to Chicago via Albuquerque and Kansas City)
El Capitan (Los Angeles to Chicago via Albuquerque and Kansas City)
Grand Canyon (Los Angeles to Chicago via Albuquerque and Kansas City)
Super Chief (Los Angeles to Chicago via Albuquerque and Kansas City)
Union Pacific:
Challenger (Los Angeles to Chicago via Ogden, UT)
City of Los Angeles (Los Angeles to Chicago via Ogden, UT)
City of St. Louis (Los Angeles to St. Louis via Ogden, UT and Kansas City)

Architecture and design

Local politicians requested ATSF to build a new station on a much larger scale than the previous.  The new station, designed by architect W.A. Mohr, cost $800,000 to build and was officially opened on 15 July 1918.  At that time, it was the largest railway station west of the Mississippi River.  The San Bernardino Sun wrote "Santa Fe's Station to be the finest in the west."  A few years after the depot's opening, an extension was added that included a Harvey House and living quarters.

The historic depot is built in the Mission Revival Style with Moorish Revival and Spanish Colonial Revival features. Utilizing hollow clay blocks, a red tile roof and stucco exterior, the depot was designed to withstand fire.  Four domed towers are built around a large center lobby with polished tile walls and floor.  The interior includes handcrafted high beams, coffered ceilings and decorative column capitals.

The depot was featured in Visiting... with Huell Howser Episode 711.

Decline and renovation
The station saw heavy use throughout the 20th century.  But like with many railroad stations, there was a gradual decline in usage with the advent of automobiles, buses and air travel. The Harvey House closed in the 1950s. In 1971, the ATSF transferred its passenger service to Amtrak.  From 1979 to 1997 Amtrak's Desert Wind (Los Angeles-Las-Vegas-Denver-Chicago) made stops at the station. Metrolink began service to the station on May 17, 1993.

In 1992, San Bernardino Associated Governments (SANBAG) purchased the historic depot from Santa Fe.  While Amtrak and Metrolink stopped using the depot in favor for a much smaller newer structure on the west side of the older one, SANBAG acquired over $15 million from federal and local grants and funds to begin an extensive restoration of the historic depot beginning in 2002.  In 2004, SANBAG and Metrolink moved some of their offices there.  After renovations are complete, SANBAG will share ownership with the City of San Bernardino and both agencies intend on leasing space in it. The historic depot waiting area, along with a new snack shop, opened again for Amtrak and Metrolink passengers on 2 May 2008. A new elevator, platforms, tracks, and an overpass were built in March and April 2017 as part of the Downtown San Bernardino Passenger Rail Project, an extension of Metrolink service to the San Bernardino Transit Center.

The San Bernardino Intermodal facility is directly adjacent to the station.

Services

Metrolink

Amtrak 
Amtrak's Southwest Chief, which travels between Los Angeles and Chicago, Illinois, stops daily in each direction here.

Platforms and tracks

References

External links

San Bernardino Station – USA Rail Guide (TrainWeb)

Amtrak stations in San Bernardino County, California
Metrolink stations in San Bernardino County, California
Former Atchison, Topeka and Santa Fe Railway stations in California
Atchison, Topeka and Santa Fe Railway hotels
Fred Harvey Company
National Register of Historic Places in San Bernardino County, California
Railway stations on the National Register of Historic Places in California
Buildings and structures in San Bernardino, California
Defunct hotels in California
History of San Bernardino, California
1918 establishments in California
Railway stations in the United States opened in 1918
Mission Revival architecture in California
Moorish Revival architecture in California
Spanish Colonial Revival architecture in California
Railway stations in the United States opened in 1886